The Gnostic Paul is a book by Elaine Pagels, a scholar of gnosticism and professor of religion at Princeton University. In the work, Pagels considers each of the non-pastoral Pauline epistles, and questions about their authorship. The core of the book examines how the Pauline epistles were read by 2nd century Valentinian gnostics and demonstrates that Paul could be considered a proto-gnostic as well as a proto-Catholic. 

Her treatment involves reading the Pauline corpus as being dual layered between a pneumatic, esoteric Christianity and a psychic, exoteric Christianity.

Publication data
 The Gnostic Paul: Gnostic Exegesis of the Pauline Letters (1975), Fortress Press, .
 2nd edition 1992: Trinity Press International,

External links
 Contrast of Esoteric (Higher) vs. Exoteric (Lower) Christians' Views per The Gnostic Paul, extracted by Michael Hoffman
 Review of The Gnostic Paul
 Another review of The Gnostic Paul

1975 non-fiction books
Books about the Bible
Books about ancient Christianity
Early Christianity and Gnosticism
English-language books
Paul the Apostle